Xabier López-Arostegui Eskauriaza (born 19 May 1997) is a Spanish professional basketball player for Valencia of the Spanish Liga ACB and the EuroLeague.

Professional career
López-Arostegui started his career in the youth teams of Joventut Badalona. He was one of the outstanding players at the Catalan Junior Championship of 2015, as he won the title with his team after beating CB L'Hospitalet in the final.

In 2015, he was sent to affiliated team CB Prat on a two-way contract with Joventut.

On 18 April 2018, López-Arostegui declared for the 2018 NBA draft. However, he later withdrew.

On July 5, 2021, he has signed with Valencia Basket of the Liga ACB.

International career
López-Arostegui was with the U-17 Spain national basketball team.

References

External links
 
 
 
 
 
 Xabier López-Arostegui Eskauriaza at FEB.es 
  

1997 births
Living people
Basketball players at the 2020 Summer Olympics
Basketball players from the Basque Country (autonomous community)
CB Prat players
Joventut Badalona players
Liga ACB players
Olympic basketball players of Spain
Sportspeople from Getxo
Small forwards
Spanish men's basketball players
Sportspeople from Biscay
Valencia Basket players